Hoosick is a town in Rensselaer County, New York, United States. The population was 6,924 at the 2010 census. It was named from the Hoosic River.

The Town of Hoosick is in the northeastern corner of Rensselaer County.

History
The town of Hoosick was organized in 1788, in Albany County, three years before the creation of Rensselaer County in 1791. The region was formerly the District of Hoosick (1772) and previous to that the Hoosick Patent (1688).

The Battle of Bennington of the American Revolution was fought northeast of Hoosick, on a farm owned by John Green, in the community of Walloomsac.

Geography

The northern town line is the boundary of Washington County, New York, and the eastern town line is the border of Vermont. The Hoosic River is an important waterway in the town.

Climate

Demographics

As of the census of 2000, there were 6,759 people, 2,620 households, and 1,823 families residing in the town. The population density was 107.3 people per square mile (41.4/km2). There were 2,892 housing units at an average density of 45.9 per square mile (17.7/km2). The racial makeup of the town was 97.96% White, 0.49% African American, 0.30% Native American, 0.38% Asian, 0.03% Pacific Islander, 0.34% from other races, and 0.50% from two or more races. Hispanic or Latino of any race were 0.84% of the population.

There were 2,620 households, out of which 32.7% had children under the age of 18 living with them, 54.8% were married couples living together, 10.9% had a female householder with no husband present, and 30.4% were non-families. 25.6% of all households were made up of individuals, and 11.9% had someone living alone who was 65 years of age or older. The average household size was 2.55 and the average family size was 3.06.

In the town, the population was spread out, with 25.9% under the age of 18, 7.5% from 18 to 24, 28.0% from 25 to 44, 22.3% from 45 to 64, and 16.2% who were 65 years of age or older. The median age was 39 years. For every 100 females, there were 91.4 males. For every 100 females age 18 and over, there were 90.5 males.

The median income for a household in the town was $41,304, and the median income for a family was $46,442. Males had a median income of $35,899 versus $24,211 for females. The per capita income for the town was $20,614. About 5.3% of families and 6.7% of the population were below the poverty line, including 9.5% of those under age 18 and 7.9% of those age 65 or over.

Communities and locations in Hoosick

Buskirk (formerly "Buskirk Bridge") – A hamlet in the northwestern corner of the town on Route 67. The Buskirk Covered Bridge and Brownell–Cornell–Gibbs Farmstead are listed on the National Register of Historic Places.
Eagle Bridge – A hamlet east of Buskirk on Route 67
East Buskirk – A hamlet south of Buskirk on Route 103
East Hoosick – A hamlet east of Hoosick Falls near the eastern town line
Mapletown – A neighborhood within East Hoosick
Hoosick (or "Hoosick Corners") – A hamlet south of Hoosick Falls in the southeastern section of the town. The Breese-Reynolds House, David Mathews House, and Tibbits House are listed on the National Register of Historic Places.
Hoosick Falls – The Village of Hoosick Falls is near the center of the town
Hoosick Junction – A location northwest of Hoosick Falls
North Hoosick (formerly "St. Croix") – A hamlet north of Hoosick Falls on Route 22
Potterville – A hamlet in the southwestern part of the town on Route 7
Southwest Hoosick – A hamlet near the western town line and south of West Hoosick
Trumanville – A former community, now part of Hoosick Falls
Walloomsac – A hamlet east of North Hoosick on Route 67
West Hoosick – A hamlet west of Hoosick Falls and near the western town line
White Creek Station – A location in the northeastern corner of the town

Notable people
Among the notable natives of Hoosick are:
Chester Arthur, US President, lived in Hoosick for a period of time
 (Big Band Singers) Bob Eberly and Ray Eberle
Romulus Whitaker, Indian herpetologist
 Simon Fraser, born in Mapletown, town of Hoosick. He was an explorer who charted much of what is now British Columbia. A river, mountain, and Simon Fraser University there are named after him.
  Joshua Furnas, athlete, entrepreneur, advocate
 Eugene Goossen (1921–1997), art critic and historian, and his wife Patricia Johanson (b. 1940), noted environmental sculptor, in Buskirk hamlet
 Emory S. Harris, US Marshal for Vermont
 Annie Hawks (1836–1918), poet, gospel hymnist
 Harriet Hoctor, dancer
 Jenny Holzer, post-modern installation artist, currently resides in Hoosick
 Phipps W. Lake (1789–1860), member of the Wisconsin State Assembly, was born in Hoosick
 Grandma Moses (1860–1961), painter whose work was first discovered in a Hoosick Falls drugstore (Thorpe's Pharmacy, at the corner of John Street and New York State Route 22) in 1938, is buried in Hoosick
John Palmer (1785–1840), served two non-consecutive terms in the United States Congress
William David Thomas (1880–1936), member of the U.S. House of Representatives, the 29th District, from 1933 until his death in Washington, D.C. in 1936. Pharmacist and owner of the Thomas Pharmacy in Hoosick Falls where Grandma Moses' paintings were discovered. Buried at Maplegrove Cemetery in the village.

References

Further reading

External links

  Town of Hoosick and Village of Hoosick Falls
  Early history of Hoosick, NY

Towns in Rensselaer County, New York